Al-Majalah is a village in south-western Yemen. It is located in the Abyan Governorate. It is best known as the site of the December 2009 Al-Majalah camp attack.

External links
Towns and villages in the Abyan Governorate

Populated places in Abyan Governorate
Villages in Yemen